Hagon is a surname. Notable people with the surname include:

Alf Hagon (born 1931), English motorcycle racer
Garrick Hagon (born 1939), British-Canadian actor
Rex Hagon (born 1947), Canadian actor and television host

See also
Hagan (surname)
Hagon Beck, a river of Norfolk, England